The West Indies under-19 cricket team represents the countries of Cricket West Indies in international under-19 cricket.

The West Indies is one of only five teams to participate in every edition of the Under-19 Cricket World Cup, along with England, India, Pakistan and Sri Lanka. The team won the tournament for the first time in 2016, defeating India in the final in Bangladesh.  The West Indies also reached the final of the 2004 World Cup in Bangladesh, losing to Pakistan in the final.

Under-19 World Cup record

Coaching Staff

 Team Manager: Reon Griffith
 Head coach: Floyd Reifer
 Assistant coach: Reon Griffith
 Bowling Coach: Curtly Ambrose
 Physiotherapist: Khevyn Williams
 Strength and conditioning Coach: Gregory Seale
 Team Analyst: Dinesh Mahabir

References

External links
Under-19 World Cup 2008 Squad

Under-19 cricket teams
West Indies in international cricket
C